Alioune Sene (born 3 February 1996) is a French athlete specialising in the pole vault. He won a bronze medal at the 2015 European Junior Championships.

His personal bests in the event are 5.73 metres outdoors( Stade des Maradas, Cergy-Pontoise FRA	16 JUN 2021)    ( and 5.76 metres indoors:Stadium Miramas Métropole, Miramas,FRA 27 feb 2022)

International competitions

References

1996 births
Living people
French male pole vaulters
Sportspeople from Dakar
Senegalese emigrants to France
20th-century French people
21st-century French people